Neelu Kohli (also Nilu Kohli ) is an Indian film and television actress. She has done many roles in many Indian television series, like Sangam, Mere Angne Mein, Maddam Sir and Choti Sarrdaarni. She is also worked in Hindi films such as Housefull 2, Hindi Medium and Patiala House.

Early life
She was born and brought up in Ranchi. Her mother's is Meeta Duggal. She studied in Lorento Convent and Nirmala College. She married Harminder Singh Kohli and moved to Chandigarh.

Filmography

Films

Television

Web series 
Ghar Set Hai

References

External links

 

Living people
People from Ranchi
Punjabi people
Indian film actresses
Indian television actresses
Indian soap opera actresses
Indian web series actresses
Actresses in Hindi cinema
Actresses in Hindi television
Year of birth missing (living people)
20th-century Indian actresses
21st-century Indian actresses